The Church of the Foursquare Gospel in the Philippines, Inc. (CFGPI) is a Pentecostal Christian denomination in the Philippines. 

It is the national church body affiliated with the International Church of the Foursquare Gospel, based in Los Angeles, California. It is one of the largest and fastest growing churches in the Philippines, doubling in size between 2008 and 2022.

History
The Church of the Foursquare Gospel in the Philippines has its origins as a mission of the International Church of the Foursquare Gospel, which began in 1949.  The Church was officially founded in 1973.

Organization
Nationally, the CFGPI is run by a board of directors. It consists of a president, vice president, secretary, treasurer, general supervisor, and five members.

Bible Colleges
Foursquare Bible College – Quezon City
Foursquare Bible College, Romblon Campus Inc. – Odiongan, Romblon
Laoag Foursquare Bible College – Laoag City
NorPhil Foursquare Bible College – Baguio City
Pangasinan Foursquare Bible College – Dagupan City
Cebu Foursquare Bible College – Cebu City
Iloilo Foursquare Bible College – Iloilo City
Halls of Life Foursquare Bible College - Davao City

See also
International Church of the Foursquare Gospel

References

External links
Official website
Philippine Council of Evangelical Churches

Christian organizations established in 1973
Christian denominations in the Philippines
The Foursquare Church
Pentecostal denominations in Asia
Christian denominations established in the 20th century
1973 establishments in the Philippines
Evangelical denominations in Asia
Evangelicalism in the Philippines